The 1988 Shell Bicentennial Women's World Cup was an international cricket tournament played in Australia from 29 November to 18 December 1988. Hosted by Australia for the first time, as part of the Bicentenary celebrations, it was the fourth edition of the Women's Cricket World Cup, and came six years after the preceding 1982 World Cup in New Zealand.

The tournament was organised by the International Women's Cricket Council (IWCC), with matches played over 60 overs. Australia won the tournament for a third consecutive time, defeating England in the final by eight wickets. New Zealand defeated Ireland in the third-place playoff, while the Netherlands, the only other team at the tournament, placed fifth and last after failing to win a single match. Both Ireland and the Netherlands were making their tournament debuts. India had been invited to compete, as they had at the previous two tournaments, but were forced to withdraw after failing to secure enough money from sponsors. Two Australians, Lindsay Reeler and Lyn Fullston, led the tournament in runs and wickets, respectively. The player of the series was English all-rounder Carole Hodges, who placed third for runs scored and second for wickets taken. She received a Waterford Crystal trophy valued at A$4,000, donated by an Irish firm, R&A Bailey.

Squads

 Note: New Zealand's Nancy Williams dislocated her shoulder in one of the opening match, and was replaced by Catherine Campbell in the squad.

Venues

Warm-up matches
At least five warm-up matches were played against Australian state and invitational teams, which were interspersed throughout the tournament.

Group stage

Points table

 Note: run rate was to be used as a tiebreaker in the case of teams finishing on an equal number of points, rather than net run rate (as is now common).

Matches

1st Match

2nd Match

3rd Match

4th Match

5th Match

6th Match

7th Match

8th Match

9th Match

10th Match

11th Match

12th Match

13th Match

14th Match

15th Match

16th Match

17th Match

18th Match

19th Match

20th Match

Finals

Third place play-off

Final

The final, held at the Melbourne Cricket Ground, was broadcast live on radio and on ABC Television. It was attended by around 3,000 people, although the ground had a capacity at the time of over 90,000. Janette Brittin, who played for England in the match, later described the venue as having "wall-to-wall seating with no one sitting in them", making it "a very large and a very lonely place". No women's cricket had been played there since 1949.

Statistics

Most runs
The top five runscorers are included in this table, ranked by runs scored and then by batting average.

Source: CricketArchive
Cricinfo

Most wickets

The top five wicket takers are listed in this table, ranked by wickets taken and then by bowling average.

Source: CricketArchive
Cricinfo

References

 
1988 in women's cricket
1988
1988 in Australian cricket
World Cup 1988
November 1988 sports events in Australia
December 1988 sports events in Australia
Australian bicentennial commemorations